Augusta glyphica is the only species in the monotypic spider genus Augusta, which is endemic to Madagascar. The genus name is taken from the Latin word augusta, the feminine form of augustus, meaning "venerable".

See also

 List of spiders of Madagascar

References

Endemic fauna of Madagascar
Spiders of Madagascar
Araneidae
Spiders described in 1839